Sunny Golloway (born in Springfield, Missouri) is the head baseball coach at NCAA Division II East Central University (Ada, Okla.). His most recent stint as head baseball coach of a NCAA Division I institution was at Auburn. He was fired September 27, 2015.   He succeeded coach John Pawlowski. Golloway was hired by Auburn University on June 14, 2013. Prior to becoming the head coach of Auburn, he was the head coach at Oklahoma.

Coaching career

Oral Roberts
Golloway took over the Oral Roberts University baseball program in 1996 and saw their transition from a Division I Independent to a member of the Mid-Continent Conference in 1998. During his time with the university, the baseball team participated in NCAA Regionals from 1998 to 2003. Also during that same stretch, the Golden Eagles won the Mid-Continent Conference regular season and tournament championships. Golloway was also voted by his coaching peers as the Conference Coach of the Year in 1998, 1999, 2000, and 2002. He compiled a 335–156 (.682) total record while with Oral Roberts and averaged 42 wins per season.

Oklahoma
Golloway returned to the University of Oklahoma in 2004 as an assistant, but he was named interim head coach for the Sooners during the 2005 season and eventually was named permanent head coach. Golloway and the Sooners made it to the NCAA Tournament in all but one of his nine seasons, with 2007 being the exception. The Sooners also made it to the Super Regional round of play in 2006. In 2010, the Sooners made it the College World Series for the first time since 1995 and defeated the South Carolina Gamecocks in the opening round. However, losses to Clemson and South Carolina in later rounds eliminated the Sooners. Golloway and the Sooners returned to the Super Regionals in 2012 and 2013, and they won the 2013 Big 12 Conference tournament title, which was only the second one in school history. During his time at Oklahoma, Golloway compiled a total record of 346–181–1 and a record of 116–97–1 in conference play. In his eight full seasons as head coach, Golloway averaged 41.75 wins per season.

Auburn
Auburn University from the Southeastern Conference hired Golloway after the 2013 season to take over their baseball program. His team went 28–28 (10–20 SEC) during the 2014 season, finishing 13th in the 14-team Southeastern Conference and missing the SEC Tournament. His 2015 team finished ninth in the SEC at 36–26 overall (13–17 SEC) and earned a bid to the NCAA Tallahassee Regional.

He was fired on September 27, 2015 and Auburn denied him the $1.25 million buyout due under his contract, claiming the firing was for cause. Golloway sued for wrongful termination and, after being cleared of any NCAA rules violations, he and Auburn reached a settlement in January 2018.

OK Instructs
After leaving Auburn, Golloway operated OK Instructs, a baseball academy, with Oklahoma native Mickey Tettleton.

Moore High School
On May 31, 2019, Moore High School in Moore, Oklahoma announced that it was hiring Golloway as a history teacher and head baseball coach.

East Central University 
East Central University of the Div. II  Great American Conference announced the hiring of Golloway on May 25, 2022.

Head coaching record

Personal
Golloway is of Hawaiian heritage.  Born in Springfield, Mo., he grew up in Stillwater, Okla., and graduated from Stillwater High School in 1979. He attended Northeastern Oklahoma A&M Junior College in Miami, Okla., for one year before transferring to Oklahoma Christian College where he received his bachelor's degree in business in 1984. He has also done graduate work at the University of Central Oklahoma and the University of Oklahoma. He is an Oklahoma history teacher at Moore Highschool (MHS)

Golloway's wife Charlotte passed away in 2021 after a battle with cancer. She is survived by their three children: Sunni Kate, Taylor, and Callen.

See also
Auburn Tigers baseball
List of current NCAA Division I baseball coaches
Oklahoma Sooners baseball
2010 College World Series

Notes

References

External links
Official biography at SoonerSports.com

Year of birth missing (living people)
Living people
Sportspeople from Springfield, Missouri
Auburn Tigers baseball coaches
Oklahoma Sooners baseball coaches
Oral Roberts Golden Eagles baseball coaches